Allemand is a French surname meaning "German". Notable people with the surname include:

César Allemand (1846–1918), French doctor who was Senator of Basses-Alpes from 1897 to 1903
Gia Allemand (1983–2013), American model
Jean-Pierre Allemand (born 1942)
Pierre Allemand, (1662–1691), French seaman and trader in New France
Prosper Allemand (1815–1901), French doctor who was Deputy of Basses-Alpes from 1871 to 1881.
Zacharie Allemand (1762–1826), French admiral

French-language surnames